Mohamed Zamri Saleh (born 10 December 1983) is a Malaysian professional racing cyclist, who currently rides for UCI Continental team . He is the eldest brother of Harrif Saleh.

Major results

2007
 1st Stage 4 Perlis Open
2009
 3rd  Road race, Southeast Asian Games
2010
 6th Overall Melaka Governor's Cup
2011
 1st Stage 3 Tour de Bintan
 2nd Road race, National Road Championships
2012
 1st  Road race, National Road Championships
 1st Stage 2 King's Cup 2
 1st Stage 7 Tour de Singkarak
 1st Stage 4 Tour de East Java
 1st Stage 5 Tour de Brunei
 4th Road race, Asian Cycling Championships
2013
 Tour de Singkarak
1st  Points classification
1st Stage 6
 1st  Mountains classification Jelajah Malaysia
 4th Road race, National Road Championships
 8th Road race, Asian Cycling Championships
2014
 Jelajah Malaysia
1st Stages 2 & 3
2015
 3rd Road race, National Road Championships
2016
 1st  Road race, National Road Championships
 2nd Tour de Jakarta
 10th UAE Cup
2017
 1st Stage 5 Tour de Selangor
 3rd  Criterium, Southeast Asian Games

References

External links

Living people
1983 births
Malaysian people of Malay descent
Malaysian male cyclists
Southeast Asian Games medalists in cycling
Southeast Asian Games bronze medalists for Malaysia
Competitors at the 2009 Southeast Asian Games